Sydney Tigers may refer to:

 Balmain Tigers, a National Rugby League team known as the Sydney Tigers during the 1995 and 1996 seasons
 APIA Leichhardt Tigers, an Association football club currently in the New South Wales Premier League known as the Sydney Tigers starting in the 2009 season